Gunnbjørn Fjeld is the tallest mountain in Greenland, the Kingdom of Denmark, and north of the Arctic Circle. It is a nunatak, a rocky peak protruding through glacial ice.

Geography
Gunnbjørn Fjeld is located in the Watkins Range, an area of nunataks on the east coast, which contains several other summits above 3,500 metres.

History

Gunnbjørn Fjeld was first climbed on 16 August 1935 by Augustine Courtauld, Jack Longland, Ebbe Munck, Harold G. Wager, and Lawrence Wager. It is named after Gunnbjörn Ulfsson, the first European to have sighted Greenland.

The peak rises in an uninhabited part of the eastern coast of Greenland. The mountain is climbed infrequently owing to its remote location. Access is often done with helicopter or ski-equipped plane (normally from Iceland).

See also
Mont Forel, formerly assumed to be the highest point of Greenland
List of mountain peaks of Greenland
List of mountains in Greenland

References

External links

2004 trip report

Mountains of Greenland